Harold Armstrong may refer to:

Harold Armstrong (rapper) (born 1969), American rapper best known as DMG
Harold Hunter Armstrong (1884–1979), American author
Harold Armstrong (politician) (fl. 1930s), member of New York State Legislature
Harold Armstrong, character in Anzacs (TV series)
Harold Armstrong, High Sheriff of Fermanagh in 1967

See also
Harry Armstrong (disambiguation)